The original Ford Cologne V6 is a series of 60° cast iron block V6 engines produced continuously by the Ford Motor Company in Cologne, Germany, since 1965.  Along with the British Ford Essex V6 engine and the U.S. Buick V6 and GMC Truck V6, these were among the first mass-produced V6 engines in the world.

During its production run, the Cologne V6 has evolved through engine displacements of 1.8, 2.0, 2.3, 2.4, 2.6, 2.8, 2.9, and 4.0 litres. All except the Cosworth 24v derivative and later 4.0 litre SOHC engines were pushrod overhead-valve engines, with a single camshaft between the banks.

Originally, the Cologne V6 was installed in vehicles intended for Germany and Continental Europe, while the unrelated British Essex V6 was used in cars for the British market. Later, the Cologne V6 largely replaced the Essex V6 for British-market vehicles. These engines were also used in the United States, especially in compact trucks.

The Cologne V6 was designed to be compatible in installation with the Ford Taunus V4 engine, having the same transmission bolt pattern, the same engine mounts, and in many versions, a cylinder head featuring "siamesed" exhaust passages, which reduced the three exhaust outlets down to two on each side. The latter feature was great for compatibility, but poor for performance. The 2.4, 2.8 (in U.S.), 2.9, and 4.0 had three exhaust ports, making them preferable.

The engine was available in both carburetted and fuel-injected forms.

1.8
Its only application was the Ford 17M P7 from 1968 to 1971.

2.0

Applications:
 1964–1967 Ford Taunus 20M (P5)
 1967–1968 Ford 20M (P7.1)
 1968–1971 Ford 20M (P7.2)
 1969–1981 Ford Capri I – III ( Not available on UK models)
 1970–1976 Ford Taunus TC
 1976–1979 Ford Taunus II
 1979–1982 Ford Taunus III
 1975–1977 Ford Granada I (Not available on UK models)
 1977–1985 Ford Granada II (Not available on UK models)
 1982 Ford Sierra (Not available in UK models)

2.3
The first enlargement of the V6 appeared in 1967.
 1967–1968 Ford 20M P7
 1969–1971 Ford 17M RS
 1968–1971 Ford 20M P7b
 1969–1974 Ford Capri I
 1974–1978 Ford Capri II
 1978–1985 Ford Capri III
 1971–1976 Ford Taunus TC
 1976–1979 Ford Taunus II
 1979–1982 Ford Taunus III
 1977–1979 Ford Cortina IV
 1979–1982 Ford Cortina V
 1972–1977 Ford Granada I
 1977–1985 Ford Granada II
 1982–1984  Ford Sierra I
 1968 Siva Sirio
 1968 LMX 2300 HCS GT

2.4

The  was used only in Europe. Like the 2.9 L version, the camshaft is chain-driven, it has fuel injection system (EFI) and Ford's EEC-IV engine management.

Applications:
 Ford Granada III
 Ford Scorpio

2.6

The largest first-generation V6 was the  introduced in 1969. It had a  bore and stroke.

Applications:
 1969–1971 Ford 20M RS
 1969–1971 Ford 26M
 1970–1974 Ford Capri (Not available on UK models)
 1972–1977 Ford Granada (Not available on UK models)

2.6 RS

A special high-performance version had  with a  bore and stroke. It was the only first-generation engine with fuel injection. Its only application was the Ford Capri RS 2600 where it was used from 1970 to 1973 when it was replaced with the RS 3100.
 Ford Capri 2600 RS from 1970 to 1973

2.8
The second-generation Cologne V6 was introduced in 1974. While based on the 2.6, the larger bore necessitated a different block. The European version used a "siamesed" two-port exhaust manifold, similar to the one used on the V4, while the American version used three-port heads. The European approach was useful in that existing cars with the V4 engine could be upgraded with relative ease.

In Europe, the 2.8 was produced with carburetor , mechanical fuel injection (Bosch K-Jetronic, and electronic injection (Ford EEC-IV). Electronic injection only featured on the 2.8 Granada models for one year before being replaced with the 2.9 unit.

Tuning options are very limited with the Bosch K-Jetronic models. The siamesed inlet and exhaust ports of the 2.8 only respond well to forced induction or an overbore; normal tuning will yield only minor power results. The MFI 2.8 Cologne (Capri/Sierra 2.8i) uses a very restricted induction setup, and no open air kit is available due to this.

Ford offered a limited run of approximately 150 "Capri turbos" with turbocharged 2.8 engines. These engines displayed RS badging and used a productionized version of an existing aftermarket kit offered by a Ford dealer in Germany.

TVR Tasmin/280i used the Cologne 2.8 with Bosch K-Jetronic fuel injection, as did the early TVR 'S' series in 2.8 and revised 2.9 efi injection form.

Applications:
 TVR 280i/Tasmin
 TVR S1
 Ford Ranger
 Ford Bronco II
 Ford Aerostar
 Ford Pinto
 Mercury Bobcat
 Mercury Capri
 Ford Mustang II
 Ford Mustang (Gen 3 1979)
 Ford Granada
 Ford Capri III
 Ford Sierra XR4x4 and XR4i
 Ford Scorpio
 Bandvagn 206
 Reliant Scimitar (1979 onwards)
 Panther Kallista

2.9

The 2.9 L shares the same basic design as the 2.8 L model, bar a few subtle differences. The camshaft is chain-driven rather than gear driven, so it rotates in the same direction as the crankshaft. The arrangement of the exhaust valves is different, eliminating the "hot-spot" that existed on the 2.8 L model. The cylinder heads also sport a more conventional three-port exhaust manifold.

In Europe, this engine was commonly fitted with the Bosch L-Jetronic fuel-injection system, married to Ford's EEC-IV engine management. Because of this difference over the 2.8 L model, this version was a more popular candidate for aftermarket modification (typically turbocharging) from companies such as Janspeed and Turbo Technics.

Applications:
 TVR S2/S3(C)/S4C
 Ford Bronco II
 Ford Ranger
 Ford Sierra XR 4X4
 Ford Granada
 Ford Scorpio
 Ford Transit
 Merkur Scorpio
 Panther Kallista

2.9 Cosworth
A special twin DOHC (QUAD CAM) version of the 2.9 was created by Cosworth Engineering in 1991. This engine (code BOA) was used in the Ford Scorpio Cosworth 24V. This engine configuration was only paired with an improved A4LDe automatic gearbox with partial electronic shift control. No manual gearbox was offered from the factory.

The standard Ford-issued block was machined differently to improve strength. In place of the single-cam arrangement, an endless duplex hydraulically tensioned timing chain was used to drive the overhead cams. The chain measured . The casting and bearings for the standard underhead cam were repurposed for a shaft which drove the oil pump. Ignition was controlled by an EDIS-6 system, which would become a standard feature.

The engine was known for its substantial increase in power delivery above 4000 rpm relative to the unmodified version; in recent years, the engine has become a popular choice as a replacement engine for the Ford Sierra XR4x4 and XR4i.

An improved version of this engine (code BOB) was available in the restyled 1995 Ford Scorpio. Differences included two simplex chains with two hydraulic tensioners and the addition of a variable-length intake system called VIS. This was mated to a fully electronically controlled A4LDE automatic transmission.

4.0

The pushrod , with a bore and stroke  version, although produced in Cologne, Germany, was only fitted to American vehicles. The OHV engine was produced until 2000 and was used in the Ford Explorer, Ford Aerostar, Mazda B4000, and Ford Ranger. Though some variation exists, typically  is quoted as horsepower for 1990–92 applications.

Applications:
 Ford Ranger/Mazda B-Series
 Ford Explorer/Mazda Navajo
 Cross Lander 244X
 Ford Aerostar (1990–1997)

SOHC

The SOHC version was introduced in 1997 in the Ford Explorer, alongside the original pushrod version. It features a variable length intake manifold and produces  and f. (The variable length intake manifold was discontinued in 1998, replaced by a standard intake.) It uses a jackshaft in place of a camshaft to drive a timing chain to each cylinder head. Three timing chains are used, one from the crank to the jackshaft, one in the front of the engine to drive the cam for the left bank, and one on the back of the engine to drive the cam for the right bank. In addition, the 4WD Ranger with the SOHC 4.0 had a 4th timing chain driving what Ford called a balance shaft. Ford has since phased out the engine in favor of the more powerful and efficient Duratec 37.

Timing chain problems 

The 4.0 SOHC engine was notorious for the OEM timing chain guides and tensioners breaking, resulting in timing chain rattle or "death rattle". Due to the SOHC engine's unique design involving both front and rear timing chains, the repair of the timing guides would often require complete engine removal depending on the severity of the problem. When the engine is run for an extended period of time with this issue the engine can jump timing, damaging the heads and valves.

Timing chain rattle was mitigated in later years of the SOHC (in most vehicles, after 2002) with updated cassettes and tensioners. This problem occurs with varying frequency among some Ford vehicles equipped with the SOHC engine including the Ford Mustang, Ford Explorer, and Ford Ranger. The 4.0 OHV was not affected by this issue.

Other versions

The Ford Courier version produces 154 kW (209 PS; 207 hp) of power and 323 N⋅m (32.9 kg⋅m; 238 lb⋅ft) of torque. The Land Rover version of the engine became unavailable in the United States for the 2008 model year.

Applications:
 2001–2012 Ford Ranger
 2001–2010 Mazda B4000
 1997–2010 Ford Explorer/Mercury Mountaineer
 2004–2006 Ford Courier
 2005–2010 Ford Mustang
 2005–2009 Land Rover Discovery 3 / LR3 The Land Rover version of the cast iron engine block has different motor mount castings/machined surfaces for the motor mounts and the left mount engine knock sensor, plus the engine girdle (upper oil pan) has a threaded hole drilled and tapped for an engine oil temperature sensor.

Turbo and supercharging
A number of companies have produced forced induction versions of the engine.

Janspeed produced single and twin-turbo 2.8 and 2.9 engines.

Sprintex produced 2.8 and 2.9 supercharged engines.

Turbo Technics produced single and twin turbo 2.8 and 2.9 engines:
 2.8 single 
 2.8 single 
 2.8 single 
 2.8 twin 
 2.9 twin 
 2.9 twin 
 2.9 twin 
 2.9 twin  MINKER

As well, Moddbox produces a kit to adapt an Eaton M90 supercharger originally from a Thunderbird Super Coupe to the 4.0 SOHC engine.

A limited number of 24V BOA/BOB's have forced induction also a racing version of BOA called, BOE (naturally aspirated):
 2.3 turbo was available in the 20M/Capri/Granada/OSI and produced 
 2.6 Turbo was available in some cars with 
 2.8 Turbo came later with 

An Eichberg 2.8i turbo was also available.

Capacity increases
In 1991 increased capacities for the 2.8 and 2.9 engines (3.5 and 3.7 litres, respectively), were first developed and introduced by D.P. Davies and sold by his company, VeeTech Engineering now RND Engineering in the UK.
Two companies still produce large capacity conversions on the 2.8 & 2.9: Power Engineering and Specialised Engines.

References

 Anderson, Doug. Rebuilding The Ford 4.0L Pushrod V6 , Engine Builder, April 2001.

Cologne
Goods manufactured in Germany
V6 engines
Gasoline engines by model